Leyla Hirsch (born September 27, 1996) is a Russian-born American professional wrestler currently signed to All Elite Wrestling, but is currently inactive due to suffering a knee injury.

Professional wrestling career

Independent circuit (2017–present)
Hirsch made her professional wrestling debut at Combat Zone Wrestling's Dojo Wars: Super Show 4 event on September 29, 2017 where she lost to Dojo DEEJ in a intergender match. During her time in CZW, she worked with other infamous personalities such as Penelope Ford, whom she faced at CZW Greetings From Asbury Park on February 23, 2018 in a losing effort. She even challenged Eran Ashe for the CZW Medal of Valor Championship in a last man standing match at CZW Dojo Wars SuperShow Seventeen on February 15, 2019 but unsuccessfully. Hirsch also competed in Westside Xtreme Wrestling, making her debut against Valkyrie at wXw Road To World Tag Team Festival: Neumünster on September 14, 2019. She fought in the wXw Femmes Fatales 2019 Tournament where she managed to reach the final match, the prize being a wXw Women's Championship at the 19th Anniversary show. She eventually got defeated by LuFisto. Hirsch had a brief run with the Japanese promotion World Wonder Ring Stardom, where she was a part of the Tokyo Cyber Squad stable and often fought alongside her fellow stablemates Hana Kimura, Jungle Kyona and Konami. On August 28, 2021, Hirsch faced Kamile at NWA Empowerrr for the NWA World Women's Championship, which Hirsch lost.

All Elite Wrestling (2020–present)
On October 21, 2020 Hirsch made her AEW debut on AEW Dark where she lost to Hikaru Shida. The following day on AEW Dynamite she unsuccessfully challenged Serena Deeb for the NWA World Women's Championship. On November 11 on AEW Dark Hirsch picked up her first win AEW win against Tesha Price. On February 4, 2021 on Dynamite She took part in the AEW Women's World Championship Eliminator Tournament, losing to Thunder Rosa in the first round. It was confirmed on March 15 by AEW president Tony Khan that Hirsch had officially signed with the company. On August 4 on AEW Dynamite Homecoming, Hirsch faced The Bunny in a NWA World Women's title eliminator which Hirsch won. From December till March 2022, Hirsch feuded with Kris Statlander and Red Velvet. Hirsch would face Statlander at Revolution's buy-in show, turning up victorious. On April 6, Hirsch suffered a torn ACL in an AEW Dark Elevation taping. Six Weeks later she underwent surgery. It is unknown when she will return.

Personal life
Hirsch was born in Moscow, Russia. She was adopted by an American couple at the age of 8, and grew up in Hillsborough Township, New Jersey. At the age of 15, she began amateur wrestling in high school and college. On March 10, 2022, shortly after the beginning of the Russian invasion of Ukraine, Hirsch issued a statement on social media in support of Ukraine. She called the Russian President Vladimir Putin a "brutal dictator".

Championships and accomplishments 
 Pro Wrestling Illustrated
 Ranked No. 61 of the top 150 female singles wrestlers in the PWI Women's 100 in 2021
 Ranked No. 473 of the top 500 singles wrestlers in the PWI 500 in 2020

References

External links 
 

1996 births
Living people
All Elite Wrestling personnel
American female professional wrestlers
American female sport wrestlers
Russian emigrants to the United States
Expatriate professional wrestlers
Expatriate professional wrestlers in Japan
LGBT people from New Jersey
LGBT professional wrestlers
Russian LGBT sportspeople
Professional wrestlers from New Jersey
Russian female professional wrestlers
Sportspeople from Hillsborough Township, New Jersey
Sportspeople from Moscow
21st-century American women
American adoptees
Russian activists against the 2022 Russian invasion of Ukraine
21st-century professional wrestlers